The Forqué Awards or José María Forqué Awards (also ) are film and television awards presented by the association of audiovisual producers , honoring the best of Spanish cinema and television.

History 
Created in 1996, they are named after Spanish filmmaker and producer José María Forqué. In the 15th edition (2010), the awards started recognising performances (initially a single non-gender category to Best Performance). Since the 19th edition (2014), the awards include a category recognising the best Latin-American film. The TV categories were added in the 26th edition.

Editions 

 20th Forqué Awards
 21st Forqué Awards (Palacio Municipal de Congresos, Madrid, 11 January 2016)
 22nd Forqué Awards (Teatro de la Maestranza, Seville, 14 January 2017)
 23rd Forqué Awards (Palacio de Congresos, Zaragoza, 13 January 2018)
 24th Forqué Awards (Palacio de Congresos, Zaragoza, 12 January 2019)
 25th Forqué Awards (Palacio Municipal de Congresos, Madrid, 11 January 2020)
 26th Forqué Awards (Palacio Municipal de Congresos, Madrid, 16 January 2021)
 27th Forqué Awards (IFEMA Palacio Municipal, Madrid 11 December 2021)
 28th Forqué Awards (IFEMA Palacio Municipal, Madrid, 17 December 2022)

Winners

Best Film

Best Latin-American Film

EGEDA Gold Medal 
In addition to the competitive awards, EGEDA also honours a career in the audiovisual industry every edition by gifting a gold medal (usually announced in advance). A list with some of the recipients of the honorary award is as follows:

References 

 
Spanish film awards
Spanish television awards
Awards established in 1996
1996 establishments in Spain